The following is a list of New Zealand artists.

A

B

C

D

E

F

G

H

I

J

K

L

M

N

O

P

R

S

T

U

V

W

Y

Z

See also
List of New Zealand women artists
New Zealand art

References

New Zealand
Artists